The 2003 Hertsmere Borough Council election took place on 1 May 2003 to elect members of Hertsmere Borough Council in Hertfordshire, England. One third of the council was up for election and the Conservative Party stayed in overall control of the council.

After the election, the composition of the council was:
Conservative 25
Labour 8
Liberal Democrat 6

Background
Before the Conservatives ran the council with 25 seats, compared to 9 for Labour and 5 Liberal Democrats. A total of 38 candidates contested the 13 seats that were up for election. Both the Conservative and Labour parties stood in all 13 seats, while there were also 10 Liberal Democrats, 1 Green Party and 1 Socialist Labour Party candidates.

Election result
The Conservatives maintained an 8-seat majority with 25 councillors, Labour dropped 1 to 8 seats, while the Liberal Democrats gained 1 to 6 seats. The Conservatives gained a seat in Borehamwood Hillside by 98 votes, with Jean Heywood reclaiming a seat on the council after having lost her seat in Borehamwood Cowley Hill in 2002 standing as an independent. However the Liberal Democrats took a seat from the Conservatives in Bushey St James.

The count saw angry words from the Labour group leader Frank Ward, who had held his seat in Borehamwood Kenilworth by just 28 votes. Ward said "Conservative councillors have no place in Borehamwood" and "it was a campaign that was marred by vilification, smears and lies".

Ward results

References

2003 English local elections
2003
2000s in Hertfordshire